The Institute For Figuring (IFF) is an organization based in Los Angeles, California that promotes the public understanding of the poetic and aesthetic dimensions of science, mathematics and the technical arts. Founded by Margaret Wertheim and Christine Wertheim, the institute hosts public lectures and exhibitions, publishes books and maintains a website.

Published works

 Robert Kaplan The Figure That Stands Behind Figures: Mosaics of the Mind (2004)
 Margaret Wertheim A Field Guide to Hyperbolic Space (2005)
 Margaret Wertheim A Field Guide to the Business Card Menger Sponge (2006)
 Margaret Wertheim, Christine Wertheim Crochet Coral Reef: A Project (2015)

See also

 Mathematics and fiber arts
 European Society for Mathematics and the Arts

References

External links

Educational institutions established in 2003
Culture of Los Angeles
Science and culture
Mathematical institutes
2003 establishments in California